Carn is the official magazine of the Celtic League. The name, a Celtic word which has been borrowed into English as 'cairn', was chosen for its symbolic value and because it can be found in each of the living Celtic languages.  The subtitle is: 'A Link Between the Celtic Nations'.

Overview 
Founded in 1973, Carn is dedicated to highlighting and furthering the aims of the Celtic League, including language preservation and self-determination for the Six Celtic Nations.

The articles are published in English, with articles also in the six Celtic languages: Breton, Cornish, Irish, Manx, Scottish Gaelic, and Welsh, with translations and summaries in English. In the past, articles have also appeared in French.

Notable contributors have included the Scottish Gaelic poet Sorley MacLean.

The cover of the magazine for a number of years has been a map showing the various Celtic countries, notated with their names in their respective native languages.

Editors 
The editors of Carn have included:
 Frang MacThòmais (1973–1974), Scottish
 Pádraig Ó Snodaigh (1974–1977), Irish
 Cathal Ó Luain (1977–1981), Irish
 Pedyr Pryor (1981–1984), Cornish
 Pat Bridson (1984–2013), Manx (living in Ireland)
 Rhisiart Tal-e-bot (2013–present), Cornish

References

External links 
 CARN website
 The Celtic League

Cultural magazines published in the United Kingdom
Magazines established in 1973
Manx media
Mass media in Cornwall
Quarterly magazines published in the United Kingdom
Multilingual magazines
Political magazines published in Ireland